The Shock Punch is a 1925 American silent boxing drama film produced by Famous Players-Lasky and distributed by Paramount Pictures. It starred Richard Dix and Frances Howard.

Plot
Coming face-to-face with a couple of ruffians, champion boxer Terrence O'Rourke and construction worker Bull Mallarkey, the equally tough Randall Savage flattens each with a single punch.

Randall has a romantic interest in Dorothy Clark, whose father is erecting a new building. To get closer to her, Randall lands a job as a riveter. He then learns that not only is Bull Malarkey foreman of the crew, but is plotting to ruin Dorothy's father in business as well. Randall makes sure that does not happen.

Cast

Preservation
A print of The Shock Punch is preserved at the Library of Congress.

References

External links

Stills at silenthollywood.com

1925 films
American silent feature films
Paramount Pictures films
Films based on short fiction
1920s sports drama films
American sports drama films
American black-and-white films
American boxing films
1925 drama films
Films directed by Paul Sloane
1920s American films
Silent American drama films
1920s English-language films
Silent sports drama films